Mandar Hill railway station (Code:MDLE) is a railway station on the Bhagalpur–Dumka railway line in Banka district of Bihar state in India. It is in the Malda railway division of the Eastern Railway zone of Indian Railways.

History 
It's been a broad gauge track since 1893. The track was extended southwards to Hansdiha in 2014 and further connected to Dumka in 2015.

Station layout

Trains 
Four passenger trains running between Bhagalpur junction and Godda and Dumka stop at Mandar Hill railway station. 

3 Express trains halt here. 12349/12350- Godda New Delhi Humsafar Express (weekly)

13015/13016- Jamalpur Howrah Kaviguru Express(Daily) 

18603/18604 - Godda Ranchi Express(Tri Weekly)

Nearest airport 
The nearest airports are Birsa Munda Airport at Ranchi,
Gaya Airport, Lok Nayak Jayaprakash Airport at Patna and Netaji Subhas Chandra Bose International Airport at Kolkata.

See also 

 Banka, Bihar
 
 
 Jasidih–Dumka–Rampurhat line
 
 List of railway stations in India

References

External links 

Official website of the Indian railway
Mandar Hill Station map

Railway stations in Banka district
Malda railway division